Deficit Round Robin (DRR), also Deficit Weighted Round Robin (DWRR), is a scheduling algorithm for the network scheduler. DRR is, like weighted fair queuing (WFQ), a packet-based implementation of the ideal Generalized Processor Sharing (GPS) policy. It was proposed by M. Shreedhar and G. Varghese in 1995 as an efficient (with O(1) complexity) and fair algorithm.

Details 
In DRR, a scheduler handling N flows is configured with one quantum  for each flow. This global idea is that, at each round, the flow  can send at most  bytes, and the remaining, if any, is reported to the next round.

Algorithm
The DRR scans all non-empty queues in sequence. When a non-empty queue  is selected, its deficit counter is incremented by its quantum value. Then, the value of the deficit counter is a maximal number of bytes that can be sent at this turn: if the deficit counter is greater than the packet's size at the head of the queue (HoQ), this packet can be sent, and the value of the counter is decremented by the packet size. Then, the size of the next packet is compared to the counter value, etc. Once the queue is empty or the value of the counter is insufficient, the scheduler will skip to the next queue. If the queue is empty, the value of the deficit counter is reset to 0.

 Variables and Constants
     const integer N             // Nb of queues
     const integer Q[1..N]       // Per queue quantum 
     integer DC[1..N]            // Per queue deficit counter
     queue queue[1..N]           // The queues   

 Scheduling Loop
 while true do
     for i in 1..N do
         if not queue[i].empty() then
             DC[i]:= DC[i] + Q[i]
             while( not queue[i].empty() and
                          DC[i] ≥ queue[i].head().size() ) do
                 DC[i] := DC[i] − queue[i].head().size()
                 send( queue[i].head() )
                 queue[i].dequeue()
             end while 
             if queue[i].empty() then
                 DC[i] := 0
             end if
         end if
     end for
 end while

Performances: fairness, complexity, and latency

Like other GPS-like scheduling algorithm, the choice of the weights is left to the network administrator.

Like WFQ, DRR offers a minimal rate to each flow whatever the size of the packets is. In weighted round robin scheduling, the fraction of bandwidth used depend on the packet's sizes.

Compared with WFQ scheduler that has complexity of O(log(n)) (n is the number of active flows/queues), the complexity of DRR is O(1), if the quantum  is larger than the maximum packet size of this flow. Nevertheless, this efficiency has a cost: the latency, i.e., the distance to the ideal GPS, is larger in DRR than in WFQ. More on the worst-case latencies can be found here.

Implementations 

An implementation of the deficit round robin algorithm was written by Patrick McHardy for the Linux kernel and published under the GNU General Public License.

In Cisco and Juniper routers, modified versions of DRR are implemented: since the latency of DRR can be larger for some class of traffic, these modified versions give higher priority to some queues, whereas the others are served with the standard DRR algorithm.

See also
 Scheduling algorithm
 Fair Queuing 
 Generalized processor sharing
 Weighted Fair Queuing 
 Weighted round robin
 Fairness measure

Notes

References

External links
 UC Berkeley EE122 lecture: Efficient fair queueing using deficit round robin

Network scheduling algorithms